Kartal is a village in Pest County, Central Hungary Region, Hungary.

References

Populated places in Pest County